Sri Ramakrishna Institute of Technology (SRIT) is one of autonomous engineering colleges in Pachapalayam, Coimbatore, Tamil Nadu, India. It was founded in 2002 by Sevaratna Dr.R.Venkatesalu. It belongs to the SNR and sons trust founded by Sevaratna Dr.R.Venkatesalu. It is affiliated to Anna University and AICTE. It offers six undergraduate and five postgraduate courses. The college became autonomous in 2017 and all courses were accredited by the NAAC and given "A" grade.

Campus

 Campus area  with built up area of 65,117 Sq.m.
 Computing facilities with 413 terminals
 Internet with dedicated lines
 Effluent treatment plant
 On–campus accommodation for boys and girls, capacity 1200
 Rural Health Centre with ambulance
 Transport: buses 15, cars 5.
 Language lab
 Anna University EDUSAT
 E learning Centre
 2 Spacious Seminar Halls

Programmes 
The courses provided by the college are as follows:

B.E. Degree Programmes (four years, full-time)
 B.E. Civil Engineering (Accredited )
 B.E. Computer Science & Engineering (Accredited )
 B.E. Electronics & Communication Engineering (Accredited)
 B.E. Electrical & Electronics Engineering (Accredited)
 B.E. Mechanical Engineering (Accredited )
 B.Tech. Information Technology (Accredited )

Postgraduate programmes:

 M.E. Communication Systems 
 M.E. Computer Science and Engineering 
 M.E. Power Systems Engineering 
 M.E. Construction Engineering and Management
 M.B.A. (Master of Business Administration)

Admission procedure 
For undergraduate programmes - first year of study
 Admissions are based on Single System
 Students ranked based on performance in +2 exam 
 Admission for Management seats 35%

For undergraduate programmes - second year of study (Lateral entry)
 Strength – 10% of sanctioned seats in undergraduate programmes
 As per DOTE/Anna University norms.

For MBA programmes
 Single Window admission
 Students ranked based on performance in qualifying Degree and TANCET as per Tamil Nadu government regulations

Reservation policy as per Tamil Nadu Government rules.

External links
 Official website

Educational institutions established in 2002
Engineering colleges in Coimbatore
2002 establishments in Tamil Nadu